Emerson College is a private college in Boston, Massachusetts, United States

Emerson College may also refer to:
Emerson College (UK) in East Sussex, England
Emerson Institute in Mobile, Alabama, US